Barak was Khan of the Golden Horde from 1423 to 1429. His father was Quyurchuq, the son of Urus Khan, who was a descendant of Tuqa-Timur, the son of Jochi, the eldest son of Genghis Khan. 

Barak took support from Ulugh Beg, the Timurid khan, and in 1422 he dethroned Kepek, Ulugh Muhammad as well as Dawlat Berdi, khans of the Golden Horde. And Barak Khan reoccupied Sighnak from the Timurids. However, he was defeated in 1427 by Ulugh Muhammad and was promptly assassinated by Jochi's descendant, Mohammed, who claimed the steppe between the Ural and Syr Darya rivers for his dynasty.

In the 1460s, Barak’s sons, Kirai and Janibek rebelled against Abu'l-Khayr Khan and they immigrated to the environs of Jeti Su (Seven Rivers) and  established the Kazakh Khanate.

Genealogy
Genghis Khan
Jochi
Tuqa-Timur
Urung-Timur (Uz-Timur, Urungbash)
Achiq
Taqtaq
Timur Khwaja
Badiq
Urus (?-1377)
Quyurchuq
 Barak Khan (?-1429)
 Janibek (1428-1480)
 Kasym Khan (1445-1521)
Haqqnazar Khan (1537-1580)

See also
List of Khans of the Golden Horde

References

 Bosworth, C. E., The New Islamic Dynasties, New York, 1996.
 Gaev, A. G., "Genealogija i hronologija Džučidov," Numizmatičeskij sbornik 3 (2002) 9-55.
 Howorth, H. H., History of the Mongols from the 9th to the 19th Century. Part II.1. London, 1880.
 Judin, V. P., Utemiš-hadži, Čingiz-name, Alma-Ata, 1992.
 May, T., The Mongol Empire, Edinburgh, 2018.
 Počekaev, R. J., Cari ordynskie: Biografii hanov i pravitelej Zolotoj Ordy. Saint Petersburg, 2010a.
 Sabitov, Ž. M., Genealogija "Tore", Astana, 2008.
 Sagdeeva, R. Z., Serebrjannye monety hanov Zolotoj Ordy, Moscow, 2005.
 Tizengauzen, V. G. (trans.), Sbornik materialov otnosjaščihsja k istorii Zolotoj Ordy. Izvlečenija iz persidskih sočinenii, republished as Istorija Kazahstana v persidskih istočnikah. 4. Almaty, 2006.
 Vohidov, Š. H. (trans.), Istorija Kazahstana v persidskih istočnikah. 3. Muʿizz al-ansāb. Almaty, 2006.

1429 deaths
Khans of the Golden Horde
15th-century monarchs in Asia
Year of birth unknown